Feeling the Space is Yoko Ono's fourth solo album, her last one on Apple Records.

History
The entire album adopts a feminist theme, focusing on issues affecting women in the 1970s. Its liner notes parody adult advertising, giving the telephone numbers, birthdates and vital statistics of the male band members. (John Lennon appears as "John O'Cean", with his number listed as "Not for Sale"). Lennon played guitar on the tracks "Woman Power" and "She Hits Back", and sings a backing vocal line on "Men, Men, Men". Lennon's album, Mind Games, was released around the same time as Feeling the Space, in November 1973.

The album was originally planned to be a double until EMI/Apple demanded it be edited; two of the songs excised from the double were issued as singles in Japan. The entire released album, plus the songs originally intended for the double release, is included as the "Run, Run, Run" disc on the "Onobox" set. The five extra songs included on Onobox were later added as bonus tracks to the 2017 Reissue of Feeling the Space.

Track listing
All songs written by Yoko Ono.

Personnel
 Yoko Ono – vocals, backing vocals
 David Spinozza – acoustic guitar 
 Ken Ascher – piano, Hammond organ, mellotron on "Growing Pain"
 Gordon Edwards – bass guitar
 Jim Keltner – drums
 Michael Brecker – saxophone
 Arthur Jenkins Jr. – percussion
 David Friedman – vibraphone
 Sneaky Pete Kleinow – pedal steel guitar 
 John O'Cean (John Lennon) – guitar on "She Hits Back" and "Woman Power"
 Don Frank Brooks – harmonica
 Jeremy Steig – flute
 Andrew Smith – drums on "Growing Pain"
 Robert "Bob Babbitt" Kreinar – bass guitar on "Growing Pain"
 Rick Marotta – drums on "If Only"
 Something Different Chorus on "Run, Run, Run", "Straight Talk", "Angry Young Woman", "She Hits Back" and "Women Power"
Technical
George Marino – mastering engineer

Release history

Notes

References

Yoko Ono albums
1973 albums
Apple Records albums
Rykodisc albums
Albums produced by Yoko Ono
Albums produced by John Lennon
Plastic Ono Band albums